Trichocline spathulata, common name native gerberam is a plant in the family Asteraceae, found in the south-west of Western Australia.

It was first described in 1836 by Allan Cunningham as Celmisia spathulata, but was transferred to the genus  Trichocline in 1967 by James Hamlyn Willis.

The species epithet, spathulata, is a Latin adjective describing some part of the plant as being spoon-shaped.

References

External links 
 Trichocline spathulata occurrence data from Australasian Virtual Herbarium

Flora of Western Australia
Plants described in 1836
Taxa named by Allan Cunningham (botanist)
Mutisieae